Euphorbia tridentata is a species of succulent spurge native to the southern Cape, South Africa.

Description

A small, low, spreading, semi-geophytic stem-succulent, with tuberous roots and rhizomes. During the dry seasons, the stems can die back above ground. The stems are somewhat segmented. Each branch is rounded-to-cylindrical, but at its point of growth it is constricted. 

The solitary cyathia are carried on short peduncles. Their five involucral glands each carry 3 or 4 distinctive finger-like outgrowths.

Distribution and habitat
Euphorbia tridentata is endemic to South Africa.

In the Western Cape Province, it occurs around the town of Riversdale, westwards to Heidelberg and eastwards to Mossel Bay and Hartenbos.

References

tridentata
Renosterveld
Flora of South Africa